Andrés Scotti Ponce de León (born 14 December 1975) is a Uruguayan former professional footballer who played as centre-back and rarely as left-back. Between 2006 and 2013, he made 40 appearances and scored one goal for the Uruguay national team

Club career

Early career
Scotti was born in Montevideo, but grew up in Trinidad, capital of Flores Department. He started his career playing football for the local village team Independiente in 1993, when he was between 17 and 18 years old. Scotti won the regional tournament title in his second season with Independiente in 1994. After three seasons in Independiente, in 1997 he joined to Central Español on trial. He spent only three months there before leaving for Montevideo Wanderers. In that club, Scotti played 12 games and scored one goal for the club during the Uruguayan first division tournament of that year.

In 1998, Scotti played for his first international club, the Chilean Primera División team Huachipato, where Scotti had a good spell, for example, having much continuity, scoring goals and being elected the best player of the tournament in his position. He remained until the next season, when he was transferred to the Mexican club Necaxa. There, he achieved third place FIFA Club World Championship 2000, after winning 4–3 on penalties against Real Madrid.
In 2001, he returned to Uruguay to play again for Montevideo Wanderers.
In 2002, he was transferred to Nacional, winning the Torneo Apertura and the Campeonato Uruguayo, scoring a goal in the second final game.

Russia and Argentina
He then moved to Russia in 2003 where he played for FC Rubin Kazan in the Russian Premier League until December 2006.

In January 2007, Scotti joined Argentine Primera División side Argentinos Juniors, on request of the team's coach Ricardo Caruso Lombardi.

Colo-Colo
On 31 December 2009, it was announced that Scotti had come to verbal agreements with Colo-Colo for an undisclosed fee. He put pen to paper on a one-year deal and joined Santiago club before New Year's Day alongside Argentinian Matías Quiroga. After overcoming medical examinations and training he made his debut on 15 January 2010, in a friendly against Olimpia which Colo-Colo drew 3–3. His league debut came on 23 January, in a 3–2 loss against Unión San Felipe and his first goal for the club was in a 3–0 home victory over Palestino after an excellent free kick. Then, on 8 May, Scotti scored his second league goal in a 5–2 win to Cobresal, his goal being voted the week's best according to CDF's top five weekly summary of goals.

After the World Cup held at South Africa (which Scotti played with Uruguay national team) he began to lose his shape, so that Diego Cagna (the club's coach) relegate him some games to the detriment of Miguel Riffo. On 7 November, Scotti played in the 2–2 Chilean derby draw with Universidad de Chile where was sent off after double yellow card following a challenge with adversary team striker Carlos Bueno.

However Colo-Colo lost the race for the title with Universidad Católica in the penultimate matchday after a seven-point lead over San Carlos team, which finished when Scotti's side lost 2–1 with O'Higgins and Católica won simultaneously 3–2 over Cobreloa at Calama.

International career
Scotti played for Uruguay in Copa América 2007 and in the FIFA World Cup 2010 where he scored a penalty in the shoot-out against Ghana.
In 2011, he won the Copa América, tournament where he scored a penalty in the shoot-out against Argentina in quarterfinals.
On 27 July 2010, he was reserved to play a friendly match against Angola in Lisboa.

On 23 June 2013, Scotti played against Tahiti in the 2013 Confederations Cup and missed a penalty at the 49th minute. Two minutes later he was red carded when he was shown a second yellow card. Uruguay went on to win the match 8–0.

He was standby player to Uruguay in FIFA World Cup 2014 in Brazil.

AUF normalisation committee
On 21 August 2018, FIFA appointed a normalisation committee for the Uruguayan Football Association (AUF). Three persons were put in charge: politicians Pedro Bordaberry (son of former dictator Juan María Bordaberry) and Armando Castaingdebat, and Scotti.

Personal life
Andrés was raised in Trinidad, the capital of Flores Department, he is the oldest son of María Cecilia Ponce de León and Carlos Scotti. He has one younger brother, Diego, that is also a footballer and plays Unión Española in Chilean Primera División. He has other two sisters, one lives in Luxembourg and the other in Uruguay.

Career statistics

International
Source:

International goals

|- bgcolor=#DFE7FF
| 1. || 9 September 2009 || Estadio Centenario, Montevideo, Uruguay ||  || 2–1 || 3–1 || 2010 FIFA World Cup qualification
|}

Honours

Club
Necaxa
 FIFA Club World Cup: third place 2000

Nacional
 Uruguayan Primera División: 2002, 2011–12

International
Uruguay
Copa América: 2011
FIFA World Cup: 2010 (fourth place)

References

External links

Andrés Scotti – Argentine Primera statistics at Fútbol XXI 

1975 births
Living people
Uruguayan sportspeople of Italian descent
Argentinos Juniors footballers
Central Español players
Club Nacional de Football players
FC Rubin Kazan players
Russian Premier League players
Association football defenders
Montevideo Wanderers F.C. players
Footballers from Montevideo
C.D. Huachipato footballers
Colo-Colo footballers
Expatriate footballers in Argentina
Expatriate footballers in Russia
Expatriate footballers in Chile
Expatriate footballers in Mexico
Uruguay international footballers
2007 Copa América players
2010 FIFA World Cup players
2011 Copa América players
Uruguayan footballers
Uruguayan expatriate footballers
Uruguayan expatriate sportspeople in Mexico
Uruguayan expatriate sportspeople in Chile
Uruguayan expatriate sportspeople in Argentina
Uruguayan Primera División players
Liga MX players
Chilean Primera División players
Argentine Primera División players
2013 FIFA Confederations Cup players
Copa América-winning players